Jewel of the South is an album by the American country music artist Rodney Crowell. Released in 1995, it was his second and last album under the MCA Records label. Like its predecessor, it failed to chart on the Billboard Top Country Albums chart. Only one track, "Please Remember Me", was released as a single; it reached No. 69 on the Hot Country Songs chart. Tim McGraw would release a successful cover of the song on his 1999 album A Place in the Sun that hit No. 1 in the United States and Canada, as well as reaching No. 10 on The Billboard Hot 100.

During a 2008 interview, Crowell cited the track "Jewel of the South" as "one of the best songs" he has written and was surprised no other artist has covered it.

Critical reception

AllMusic wrote that the album "emphasizes Crowell, the thoughtful songwriter, over Crowell the neo-honky tonk bandleader."

Track listing
All songs composed by Rodney Crowell except when noted
"Say You Love Me" – 3:47
"Candy Man" (Neil Fredericks, Beverly "Ruby" Ross) – 3:03
"Please Remember Me" (Crowell, Will Jennings) – 3:45
"The Ballad Of Possum Potez" – 3:29
"Thinking About Leaving" – 4:06
"The Ladder Of Love" – 2:54
"Just Say Yes" (Crowell, Keith Sykes) – 4:02
"Storm Of Love" (Harlan Howard, Buck Owens) – 3:01
"Love To Burn" (Crowell, Hank DeVito, Jennings) – 3:26
"Jewel Of The South" – 4:50
"Qué es amor (What Is Love)" (Crowell, Jennings, Roy Orbison) – 1:35

Personnel

 Kenny Aronoff – drums
 Eddie Bayers – drums
 Barry Beckett – piano
 Richard Bennett – electric guitar
 Rosemary Butler – background vocals
 Max Carl – background vocals
 Jon Carroll – organ, piano
 Claudia Church – background vocals
 Mike Clarke – drums
 Rodney Crowell – acoustic guitar, lead vocals
 Béla Fleck – banjo
 Kim Fleming – background vocals
 Vince Gill – background vocals
 Mike Haynes – trumpet
 Jim Horn – saxophone
 John Jorgenson – electric guitar
 Tim Lauer – organ
 Albert Lee – electric guitar
 Mark Luna – background vocals
 Charlie McCoy – harmonica
 Raul Malo – background vocals
 Steve Nathan – organ, piano
 Bill Owsley – background vocals
 Alison Prestwood – bass guitar
 Carmella Ramsey – background vocals 
 Michael Rhodes – bass guitar, fretless bass guitar
 Kim Richey – background vocals
 Chris Rodriguez – background vocals
 Matt Rollings – piano
 Steuart Smith – acoustic guitar, electric guitar
 Tommy Spurlock – steel guitar
 Michael Utley – organ
 Kenny Vaughan – electric guitar
 Hank DeVito – acoustic guitar
 Billy Joe Walker Jr. – electric guitar
 Willie Weeks – bass guitar, background vocals

References

1995 albums
Rodney Crowell albums
Albums produced by Tony Brown (record producer)
MCA Records albums
Albums produced by Rodney Crowell